Ḷ or Vocalic L is a vowel symbol of Indic abugidas. In modern Indic scripts, Ḷ is derived from the Brahmi letter . As an Indic vowel, Ḷ comes in two normally distinct forms: 1) as an independent letter, and 2) as a sign for modifying a base consonant. Bare consonants without a modifying vowel sign have the inherent "A" vowel.

Āryabhaṭa numeration

Aryabhata used Devanagari letters for numbers, very similar to the Greek numerals, even after the invention of Indian numerals. The  ॢ sign was used to modify a consonant's value , but the vowel letter ऌ did not have an inherent value by itself.

Historic Ḷ
There are three different general early historic scripts - Brahmi and its variants, Kharoṣṭhī, and Tocharian, the so-called slanting Brahmi. Ḷ as found in Brahmi was missing in earlier geometric styles, but emerged as a vowel mark during more flowing styles of Brahmi, such as the Kushana and Gupta. In both Tocharian and Kharoṣṭhī, Ḷ is not currently known from any source materials.

Brahmi Ḷ
The Brahmi letter Ḷ is only found as a vowel mark, and is derived from the consonant La, and therefore is probably from the Aramaic Lamed . This would make it related to the modern Latin L and Greek Lambda. Several identifiable styles of writing the Brahmi Ḷ can be found, most associated with a specific set of inscriptions from an artifact or diverse records from an historic period. As the earliest and most geometric style of Brahmi, the letters found on the Edicts of Ashoka and other records from around that time are normally the reference form for Brahmi letters, but Ḷ must be back-formed from later forms to match the reference geometric writing style, and the reference image for the independent letter  is just the vowel mark enlarged to the size of a full letter.

Devanagari Ḷ

Ḷ (ऌ) is a vowel of the Devanagari abugida. It ultimately arose from the Brahmi letter , via Gupta. Letters that derive from it are the Gujarati letter ઌ, and the Modi letter 𑘈.

Devanagari Using Languages
The Devanagari script is used to write the Hindi language, Sanskrit and the majority of  Indo-Aryan languages. Like all Indic scripts, Devanagari vowels come in two forms: an independent vowel form for syllables that begin with a vowel sound, and a vowel sign attached to base consonant to override the inherent /ə/ vowel.

Bengali-Assamese Ḷ

Ḷ (ঌ) is a vowel of the Bengali-Assamese abugida. It is derived from the Siddhaṃ letter , and is marked by the lack of horizontal head line and less geometric shape than its Devanagari counterpart, ऌ.

Bengali-Assamese Script Using Languages
The Bengali-Assamese script is used to write several languages of eastern India, notably the Bengali language and Assamese. Like all Indic scripts, Bengali-Assamese vowels come in two forms: an independent vowel form for syllables that begin with a vowel sound, and a vowel sign attached to base consonant to override the inherent /ɔ/ vowel.

Gujarati Ḷ

Ḷ (ઌ) is a vowel of the Gujarati abugida. It is derived from the Devanagari Ḷ , and ultimately the Brahmi letter .

Gujarati-using Languages
The Gujarati script is used to write the Gujarati and Kutchi languages. Like all Indic scripts, Gujarati vowels come in two forms: an independent vowel form for syllables that begin with a vowel sound, and a vowel sign attached to base consonant to override the inherent /ə/ vowel.

Javanese Ḷ

Telugu Ḷ

Ḷ (ఌ) is a vowel of the Telugu abugida. It ultimately arose from the Brahmi letter . It is closely related to the Kannada letter ಌ. Like in other Indic scripts, Telugu vowels have two forms: and independent letter for word and syllable-initial vowel sounds, and a vowel sign for changing the inherent "a" of Telugu consonant letters. Ḷ is a non-attaching vowel sign, and does not alter the underlying consonant or contextually shape itself in any way.

Malayalam Ḷ

Ḷ (ഌ) is a vowel of the Malayalam abugida. It ultimately arose from the Brahmi letter , via the Grantha letter  l. Like in other Indic scripts, Malayalam vowels have two forms: an independent letter for word and syllable-initial vowel sounds, and a vowel sign for changing the inherent "a" of consonant letters. Vowel signs in Malayalam usually sit adjacent to its base consonant - below, to the left, right, or both left and right, but are always pronounced after the consonant sound.

Odia Ḷ

Ḷ (ଌ) is a vowel of the Odia abugida. It ultimately arose from the Brahmi letter , via the Siddhaṃ letter  l. Like in other Indic scripts, Odia vowels have two forms: an independent letter for word and syllable-initial vowel sounds, and a vowel sign for changing the inherent "a" of consonant letters. Vowel signs in Odia usually sit adjacent to its base consonant - below, to the left, right, or both left and right, but are always pronounced after the consonant sound. No base consonants are altered in form when adding a vowel sign, and there are no consonant+vowel ligatures in Odia.

Comparison of Ḷ
The various Indic scripts are generally related to each other through adaptation and borrowing, and as such the glyphs for cognate letters, including Ḷ, are related as well.

Character encodings of Ḷ
Most Indic scripts are encoded in the Unicode Standard, and as such the letter Ḷ in those scripts can be represented in plain text with unique codepoint. Ḷ from several modern-use scripts can also be found in legacy encodings, such as ISCII.

References

Indic letters